Edward Smith-Stanley, 14th Earl of Derby led the "Who? Who?" ministry, a short-lived British Conservative government which was in power for a matter of months in 1852. Lord Derby was Prime Minister and Benjamin Disraeli served as Chancellor of the Exchequer. It marked the first time the protectionist wing of the Conservative Party had taken office since the Corn Laws schism of 1846. It is also called the First Derby–Disraeli ministry.

Early in 1852 Arthur Wellesley, 1st Duke of Wellington, by then very deaf, gave Derby's first government its nickname by shouting "Who? Who?" as the list of inexperienced Cabinet Ministers was read out in the House of Lords.

History

After the fall of Lord John Russell's Whig government in early 1852, the Conservative leader Lord Derby formed a government. The Conservatives had been weakened by the defection of the Peelites, and many of the new Cabinet ministers were men of little experience. The government became known as the "Who? Who?" Ministry after Wellington's comments, due to the lack of prominence of its ministers. The government was in a significant minority, and lasted less than a year, collapsing in December. The Whigs and Peelites then formed a coalition government under the Peelite leader Lord Aberdeen.

Though the government had little impact, it attracted derision through its plethora of new political names, which demonstrated the relative inexperience of the party. Only four members of the Cabinet (Derby himself, St Leonards, Lonsdale, and Herries) were existing Privy Councillors and many others were complete political unknowns.

Cabinet

February 1852 – December 1852

List of ministers
Cabinet members are listed in bold face.

References

Bibliography
C. Cook and B. Keith, British Historical Facts 1830–1900

External links
 

British ministries
1852 establishments in the United Kingdom
1852 disestablishments in the United Kingdom
Government
Minority governments
Ministries of Queen Victoria
Benjamin Disraeli
Cabinets established in 1852
Cabinets disestablished in 1852
1850s in the United Kingdom